William Constantinos Vlachos (born May 26, 1988) is an American football coach and former player who is currently the offensive line coach at Central Michigan. He played college football at the University of Alabama.

High school career
Vlachos attended Mountain Brook High School in Birmingham, Alabama. Originally a guard, Vlachos was a three-star prospect out of high school, ranked 19th nationally by Rivals.com, 16th in the state of Alabama by Scout.com and 15th in Alabama by the Mobile Press-Register. As a senior, he was recognized on the 6A All-State team.

College career
A five-year player at Alabama, Vlachos was originally recruited by Mike Shula, not Nick Saban, as Saban replaced Shula before the 2007 season.

In his initial year at Alabama, Vlachos played in one game and was subsequently redshirted. In his second year, he saw limited action in seven games, including the 2008 Allstate Sugar Bowl.

As a redshirt sophomore in 2009 Vlachos started every game, helping pave the way for eventual Heisman Trophy winner Mark Ingram II to rush for 1658 yards and 17 touchdowns, and helped Greg McElroy throw for 2508 yard and 17 touchdowns, en route an SEC Championship and a BCS National Championship.  As a redshirt junior, Vlachos again started every game en route to a 49–7 victory over Michigan State in the 2011 Capital One Bowl. As a redshirt senior in 2011, Vlachos again paved the way for another prolific running back, this time Trent Richardson, who rushed for 23 touchdowns and finished as a Heisman Trophy candidate. Vlachos and Alabama would win another BCS National Championship.
Vlachos finished his career having started 40 consecutive games and having played in 48 total games.

Professional career
On April 30, 2012, Vlachos was signed as an undrafted free agent by the Tennessee Titans.  He was released on August 27, 2012.

Personal life
Vlachos was born in Greece to a Greek father and an American mother.

References

1988 births
Living people
Players of American football from Birmingham, Alabama
American people of Greek descent
American football centers
Alabama Crimson Tide football players
Alabama Crimson Tide football coaches
Buffalo Bills coaches